Bhai Bhaiya Aur Brother is an Indian comedy television series, which aired on the SAB TV from 4 June 2012 to 10 August 2012.

Plot

It's about a Gujarati family that unites after 15 years. Three brothers, who have been living separately with their own individual families, meet at middle brother's house in Mumbai. All are raised in three absolutely contrasting cultures. Younger brother's family has come from London and older brother's family is from a small village of Gujarat, called Pichurwadi. It's East meets West, in the centre situation, where from a 7-year-old child to 70-year-old grandmother, all of them, with various characteristics, standards of living and upbringing, live under one roof in a little humorous way with their discomforts and yet emotional bonding. The series progresses through the lighter situations mostly and warm and sensitive situations occasionally faced by all these peculiar characters, with their own individual quirks, likes and dislikes. How the families of the three brothers get into a relationship-how they need to be marginalized–how they need to learn something from one another-while embarking on a happy relationship is the main premise of the show.

Cast
Swati Chitnis as Jamuna Mahendra Patel
Muni Jha as Mahendra Patel
Chirag Vohra as Rajeev MahendraPatel 
Sooraj Thapar as Anil Mahendra Patel
Vrajesh Hirjee as Sameer Mahendra Patel
Muskaan Mihani as Jennifer Sameer Patel
Dimple Shah as Jyotsna Anil Patel
Shweta Choudhary as Juhi Rajeev Patel
Harsh Shah as Chunnu Anil Patel
Shivansh Kotia as Saral Rajeev Patel
Sadhil Kapoor as Tom Sameer Patel
 Anita Date-Kelkar as Member of patel family
 Rajesh Kumar as Chaman

References

External links
 Bhai Bhaiya Aur Brother website

Sony SAB original programming
Indian comedy television series
2012 Indian television series debuts
2012 Indian television series endings